WhizFolders is an organizer and outliner for managing notes on Microsoft Windows. WhizFolders has been around since 1998. Its predecessor WhizNote, a plain text notes organizer, was released in CompuServe forums in 1993.

WhizFolders allows to manage your information in two-panes--the left pane being a hierarchical list of note titles and the right-pane contains the detail or text of the selected note in the list. The notes can be merged when copying to the clipboard, or when exporting or printing. A boolean search for information is available. Keyword tags can also be assigned to the notes to find them even when the actual tag is absent in their text.

A freeware viewer is separately available to read WhizFolder files.

Features
Hierarchical list of note titles
Word wrapped note titles
Drag and drop outlining of note titles
Rich text note contents (RTF)
Boolean or exact search
Keyword tags
Hyperlinks to other notes or external files, web sites
Pasting from web sites with source address
Automated pasting
Merged export or printing of notes

See also
Comparison of notetaking software
Notetaking
Zim

References

Notes

Listed as note taking program in the book Your First Notebook PC
Mention in the book BCGS Genealogist
Mentioned in the book Get Your Articles Published: Teach Yourself

External links

Outliners
Note-taking software
Personal information managers